

Development
A Commercial Resupply Service contract of $1.9 billion for eight flights was awarded in 2008. As of April 2012, development costs were estimated at $472 million.

In June 2008, it was announced that the Mid-Atlantic Regional Spaceport, formerly part of the Wallops Flight Facility, in Virginia, would be the primary launch site for the rocket. Launch pad 0A (LP-0A), previously used for the failed Conestoga rocket, would be modified to handle Antares. Wallops allows launches which reach the International Space Station's orbit as effectively as those from Cape Canaveral, Florida, while being less crowded. The first Antares flight launched a Cygnus mass simulator.

On December 10, 2009, Alliant Techsystems Inc. (ATK) test-fired their Castor 30 motor for use on the second stage of the Antares rocket. In March 2010, Orbital Sciences and Aerojet completed test firings of the AJ-26 engines.  On February 22, 2013, a hot fire test was successfully performed, the entire first stage being erected on the pad and held down while the engines fired for 29 seconds.

Design

First stage
The first stage of Antares burns RP-1 (kerosene) and liquid oxygen (LOX). As Orbital had little experience with large liquid stages and LOX propellant, the first stage core was designed and is manufactured in Ukraine by KB Pivdenne and Pivdenmash and includes propellant tanks, pressurization tanks, valves, sensors, feed lines, tubing, wiring and other associated hardware.

Antares 100 series
The Antares 100-series first stage was powered by two Aerojet AJ26 engines. These began as Kuznetsov NK-33 engines built in the Soviet Union in the late 1960s and early 1970s, 43 of which were purchased by Aerojet in the 1990s. Twenty of these were refurbished into AJ26 engines for Antares. Modifications included equipping the engines for gimballing, adding US electronics, and qualifying the engines to fire for twice as long as designed and to operate at 108% of their original thrust.

Following the catastrophic failure of an AJ26 during testing at Stennis Space Center in May 2014 and the Orb-3 launch failure in October 2014, likely caused by an engine turbopump, the Antares 100-series was retired.

Antares 200 series 
Because of concerns over corrosion, aging, and the limited supply of AJ26 engines, Orbital had selected new first stage engines to bid on a second major long-term contract for cargo resupply of the ISS. After the loss of the Antares rocket in October 2014, Orbital Sciences announced that the Russian RD-181—a modified version of the RD-191—would replace the AJ-26 on the Antares 200-series. The first flight of the Antares 230 configuration using the RD-181 happened on October 17, 2016, carrying the Cygnus OA-5 cargo to the ISS.

The Antares 200 and 200+ first stages are powered by two RD-181 engines, which provide  more thrust than the dual AJ26 engines used on the Antares 100. The surplus performance of the Antares 200-series will allow Orbital to fulfill its ISS resupply contract in only four additional flights, rather than the five that would have been required with the Antares 100-series.

While the 200 series adapted the originally ordered 100 Series stages (KB Pivdenne/Pivdenmash, Zenit derived), it requires under-throttling the RD-181 engines, which reduces performance.

The Antares was upgraded to the Antares 230+ for the NASA Commercial Resupply Services 2 contract. NG-12, launched November 2, 2019, was the first NASA CRS-2 mission to ISS using the 230+ upgrades. Additionally, the company is working on trajectory improvements via a "load-release autopilot" that will provide greater mass to orbit capability.

Antares 300 series 
In August 2022, Northrop Grumman announced that it had contracted Firefly Aerospace to build the 300-series first stage, which is similar to Firefly's in-development MLV launch vehicle, and features the same composite structures as well as seven Miranda engines producing  of thrust — substantially greater than the previous 200-series first stage. Northrop Grumman states that the new first stage substantially increases the mass capability of Antares.

The announcement occurred as a result of the 2022 Russian invasion of Ukraine, which has jeopardized supply chains for the previous first stages, which are manufactured in Ukraine and use RD-181 engines from Russia.

Second stage
The second stage is an Orbital ATK Castor 30-series solid-fuel rocket, developed as a derivative of the Castor 120 solid motor used as Minotaur-C's first stage, itself based on a LGM-118 Peacekeeper ICBM first stage. The first two flights of Antares used a Castor 30A, which was replaced by the enhanced Castor 30B for subsequent flights. The Castor 30B produces  average and  maximum thrust, and uses electromechanical thrust vector control. For increased performance, the larger Castor 30XL is available and will be used on ISS resupply flights to allow Antares to carry the Enhanced Cygnus.

The Castor 30XL upper stage for Antares 230+ is being optimized for the CRS-2 contract. The initial design of the Castor 30XL was conservatively built, and after gaining flight experience it was determined that the structural component of the motor case could be lightened.

Third stage
Antares offers three optional third stages: the Bi-Propellant Third Stage (BTS), a Star 48-based third stage and an Orion 38 motor. BTS is derived from Orbital Sciences' GEOStar spacecraft bus and uses nitrogen tetroxide and hydrazine for propellant; it is intended to precisely place payloads into their final orbits. The Star 48-based stage uses a Star 48BV solid rocket motor and would be used for higher energy orbits. The Orion 38 is used on the Minotaur and Pegasus rockets as an upper stage.

Fairing

NASA Commercial Resupply Services-2 : Enhancements
On January 14, 2016, NASA awarded three cargo contracts via CRS-2. Orbital ATK's Cygnus was one of these contracts.

According to Mark Pieczynski, Orbital ATK Vice President, Flight Systems Group, "A further improved version [of Antares for CRS-2 contract] is in development which will include: Stage 1 core updates including structural reinforcements and optimization to accommodate increased loads. (Also) certain refinements to the RD-181 engines and CASTOR 30XL motor; and Payload accommodations improvements including a 'pop-top' feature incorporated in the fairing to allow late Cygnus cargo load and optimized fairing adapter structure".

Previously, it was understood that these planned upgrades from the Antares 230 series would create a vehicle known as the Antares 300 series. However, when asked specifically about Antares 300 series development, Mr. Pieczynski stated that Orbital ATK has "not determined to call the upgrades, we are working on, a 300 series. This is still TBD".

In May 2018, the Antares program manager Kurt Eberly indicated that the upgrades will be referred to as Antares 230+.

Configurations and numbering

The first two test flights used a Castor 30A second stage. All subsequent flights will use either a Castor 30B or Castor 30XL. The rocket's configuration is indicated by a three-digit number and a possible "+" suffix, the first number representing the first stage, the second the type of second stage, and the third the type of third stage. A + sign added as suffix (fourth position) signifies performance upgrades to the Antares 230 variant.

Notable missions and anomalies

Antares A-ONE

Originally scheduled for 2012, the first Antares launch, designated A-ONE was conducted on April 21, 2013, carrying the Cygnus Mass Simulator (a boilerplate Cygnus spacecraft) and four CubeSats contracted by Spaceflight Incorporated: Dove 1 for Cosmogia Incorporated (now Planet Labs) and three PhoneSat satellites – Alexander, Graham and Bell for NASA.

Prior to the launch, a 27-second test firing of the rocket's AJ26 engines was conducted successfully on February 22, 2013, following an attempt on February 13 which was abandoned before ignition.

A-ONE used the Antares 110 configuration, with a Castor 30A second stage and no third stage. The launch took place from Pad 0A of the Mid-Atlantic Regional Spaceport on Wallops Island, Virginia. LP-0A was a former Conestoga launch complex which had only been used once before, in 1995, for the Conestoga's only orbital launch attempt. Antares became the largest — and first — liquid-fuelled rocket to fly from Wallops Island, as well as the largest rocket launched by Orbital Sciences.

The first attempt to launch the rocket, on April 17, 2013, was scrubbed after an umbilical detached from the rocket's second stage, and a second attempt on April 20 was scrubbed due to high altitude winds. At the third attempt on April 21, the rocket lifted off at the beginning of its launch window. The launch window for all three attempts was three hours beginning at 21:00 UTC (17:00 EDT), shortening to two hours at the start of the terminal count, and ten minutes later in the count.

Cygnus CRS Orb-3

On October 28, 2014, the attempted launch of an Antares carrying a Cygnus cargo spacecraft on the Orb-3 resupply mission failed catastrophically six seconds after liftoff from Mid-Atlantic Regional Spaceport at Wallops Flight Facility, Virginia. An explosion occurred in the thrust section just as the vehicle cleared the tower, and it fell back down onto the launch pad. The range safety officer sent the destruct command just before impact. There were no injuries. Orbital Sciences reported that Launch Pad 0A "escaped significant damage", though initial estimates for repairs were in the $20 million range. Orbital Sciences formed an anomaly investigation board to investigate the cause of the incident. They traced it to a failure of the first stage LOX turbopump, but could not find a specific cause. However, the refurbished NK-33 engines, originally manufactured over 40 years earlier and stored for decades, were suspected as having leaks, corrosion, or manufacturing defects that had not been detected. The NASA Accident Investigation Report was more direct in its failure assessment. On October 6, 2015, almost one year after the accident, Pad 0A was restored to use. Total repair costs were about $15 million.

Following the failure, Orbital sought to purchase launch services for its Cygnus spacecraft in order to satisfy its cargo contract with NASA, and on December 9, 2014, Orbital announced that at least one, and possibly two, Cygnus flights would be launched on Atlas V rockets from Cape Canaveral Air Force Station. As it happened, Cygnus OA-4 and Cygnus OA-6 were launched with an Atlas V and the Antares 230 performed its maiden flight with Cygnus OA-5 in October 2016. One further mission was launched aboard an Atlas in April 2017 (Cygnus OA-7), fulfilling Orbital's contractual obligations towards NASA. It was followed by the Antares 230 in regular service with Cygnus OA-8E in November 2017, with three further missions scheduled on their extended contract.

Launch statistics

Launch history

Future launches

Launch sequence
The following table shows a typical launch sequence of Antares-100 series rockets, such as for launching a Cygnus spacecraft on a cargo resupply mission to the International Space Station.

See also

 Comparison of orbital launchers families
 Minotaur-C
 Falcon 9

References

External links

 

 
Rocket families
Orbital Sciences Corporation space launch vehicles
Northrop Grumman space launch vehicles
Expendable space launch systems
Articles containing video clips
Vehicles introduced in 2013